(1848–1877) was a pioneer of Western-style painting in early Meiji Japan. Born to a retainer of the Tosa Domain, he studied in England under John Edgar Williams, before opening the  art school in 1874, upon his return to Japan.

See also

 Takahashi Yuichi

References

1848 births
1877 deaths
19th-century Japanese painters
People from Kōchi Prefecture
People of Meiji-period Japan
Yōga painters